FC Neman Grodno (FK Nyoman Hrodna) is a Belarusian football club from the city of Grodno, named after the Neman River and was founded in 1964. Since 1992, the team has participated in the top league of Belarus.

History 
Since 1964, the team was playing in the third tier of the Soviet football system almost constantly, excluding two seasons (1968 and 1969) spent in the second tier. Since 1992, Neman plays in the Belarusian Premier League. In 1993, they won the Belarusian Cup. The most successful years for the team were in the early 2000s, when they finished fourth twice in a row before finishing second in 2002 after losing the first place play-off against BATE Borisov.

Name changes 
 1964: founded as Neman Grodno
 1973: renamed to Khimik Grodno
 1993: renamed to Neman Grodno
 1999: renamed to Neman-Belcard Grodno
 2002: renamed to Neman Grodno

Honours 
 Belarusian Premier League
 Runners-up (1): 2002
 Belarusian Cup
 Winners (1): 1993
 Runners-up (2): 2011, 2014

Current squad 
As of March 2023

League and Cup history

Soviet Union 

1 Advanced to the final round for one promotion spot as the best-placed team from Belarusian SSR.
2 Advanced to the semi-final round of promotion tournament (for one spot) as one of top 8 teams not from Russian, Ukrainian, Kazakh or Central Asian SSR.
3 As the worst-placed team from the Belarusian SSR, Neman had to play promotion/relegation play-off against the best-placed Belarusian team from the 3rd level.
4 In 1973, every draw was followed by a penalty shoot-out, with a winner gaining 1 point and loser gaining 0.
5 Advanced to the final round for one promotion spot as winners of their zone.

Belarus 

1 Including additional game (0–1 loss) against BATE for the first place.

Neman in Europe 
As of August, 2014.

Notes
 QR: Qualifying round
 1R: First round
 2Q: Second qualifying round

Managers 
 Valery Yanochkin (Sept 1, 1993 – April 1, 1995)
 Sergey Solodovnikov (Sept 1, 1997 – Feb 1, 1998), (May 1, 1998 – June 30, 2005)
 Vladimir Kurnev (Jan 1, 2006 – Dec 31, 2006)
 Liudas Rumbutis (Jan 1, 2007 – Dec 31, 2007)
 Vyacheslav Akshaev (Jan 4, 2008 – July 20, 2008)
 Oleg Radushko (July 21, 2008 – July 19, 2010)
 Aleksandr Koreshkov (June 25, 2010 – Aug 11, 2011)
 Pyotr Kachura (caretaker) (Aug 13, 2011 – Aug 15, 2011)
 Sergey Solodovnikov (Aug 16, 2011 – Apr 26, 2016)
 Oleg Kirenya (caretaker) (Apr 26, 2016 – Jun 16, 2016)
 Igor Kovalevich (Jun 17, 2016 –)

References

External links 
 
Neman Grodno at UEFA.COM

 
Neman Grodno
Neman Grodno
Association football clubs established in 1964
1964 establishments in Belarus